All India Federation of Democratic Youth is the youth wing of Marxist Communist Party of India (United). Previously it was the youth wing of the main predecessor of MCPI(U), the Marxist Communist Party of India.

Marxist Communist Party of India (United)
India